Cook County ISD 166, also known as Cook County Schools, is a school district headquartered in Grand Marais, Minnesota.

It is in northeast Minnesota. Its service area is all of Cook County.

History
In 2021 the school board selected Christopher Lindholm as the superintendent of the school district. He was previously the superintendent of Pequot Lakes Public Schools.

Student body
In 2021 it had about 500 students.

Transportation
One of the bus routes, the Gunflint bus route, has the longest time duration of any school bus ride in Minnesota. While it is the second longest distance-wise, extra time is added to the Gunflint route to account for road hazards.

References

External links
 Cook County ISD 166
School districts in Minnesota
Cook County, Minnesota